The 1999 TCU Horned Frogs football team represented Texas Christian University (TCU) in the 1999 NCAA Division I-A football season. The Horned Frogs finished the season 8–4 overall and 5–2 in conference to share the Western Athletic Conference championship with Hawaii and Fresno State. The team was coached by Dennis Franchione. The offense scored 362 points while the defense allowed 213 points. The Frogs played their home games in Amon G. Carter Stadium, which is located on campus in Fort Worth, Texas.

Schedule

Roster

Team players drafted into the NFL
Not one member was picked in the 2000 NFL Draft. LaDainian Tomlinson and Aaron Schobel were drafted in the 2001 NFL Draft.

References

TCU
TCU Horned Frogs football seasons
Western Athletic Conference football champion seasons
LendingTree Bowl champion seasons
TCU Horned Frogs football